Benjamin Frank Adair (1852 - March 28, 1902) was a lawyer who served in the Arkansas Legislature in 1891 representing Pulaski County.

He was included in a photo montage of African American state legislators serving in Arkansas in 1891 published in The Freeman newspaper in Indianapolis. He was a Democrat.

His father had the same name and was the owner of his mother. His father moved the family to Oberlin, Ohio when Arkansas outlawed free people of color (Arkansas's Free Negro Expulsion Act of 1859). The father freed his family.

Adair died March 28, 1902 from a suspected heart failure after suffering from heart issues.

See also
African-American officeholders during and following the Reconstruction era

References

1852 births
1902 deaths
Democratic Party members of the Arkansas House of Representatives
People from Pulaski County, Arkansas
African-American state legislators in Arkansas
20th-century African-American people